The Cairo Military Academy Stadium ( Istād al-Kullīyah al-Ḥarbīyah bil-Qāhira) is located in Cairo, Egypt and has a total capacity of 28,500.
It was one of six stadiums used in the 2006 African Cup of Nations, held in Egypt.

Seven miles up the road from Cairo International Stadium, heading for Cairo International Airport, there is the Cairo Military Academy Stadium at the far end of Orouba Street in the north-eastern Heliopolis district of Cairo.

It was built in 1989 for the use of military teams and students at the military academy. The ground accommodated home games of Al Ahly and Zamalek during the refurbishing of the Cairo International Stadium and occasionally still serves to stage matches of the old foes.

The stadium has a small roof extension serving as a cover for the main stand. On demand, during matches rent-a-crowd military cadets serve as ground-fillers in addition to the sparse paying spectators for football matches.

Gallery

References

Football venues in Egypt
Stadiums in Cairo
Sports venues completed in 1989
1989 establishments in Egypt

fr:Stade Al Salam